AWP may refer to:

Organizations

Political parties
American Workers Party
Animal Welfare Party, a political party in the United Kingdom
Australian Workers Party, a political party in Australia
Awami Workers Party, a left-wing political party in Pakistan
General Water Board Party - Algemene Waterschapspartij

Other organizations
Adventures with Purpose, a civilian scuba diving and search organization
Associated Whistleblowing Press
Association for Women in Psychology, a scientific educational organization encouraging feminist psychological research, theory, and activism
Association of Writers & Writing Programs, a literary organization
Avon and Wiltshire Mental Health Partnership NHS Trust, a mental health care provider in the south west of England
awp Finanznachrichten, a Swiss Financial News Agency

Technology
Accuracy International AWP, a sniper rifle
Adria–Wien Pipeline, a crude oil pipeline from the Italian-Austrian border to near Vienna, Austria
Advanced work packaging, in construction, a process flow of detailed work packages leading to an installation work package
Aerial work platform, a mechanical device used to effect temporary access for people or equipment to inaccessible areas, usually at height
amusement with prize, a type of slot machine popular in some European countries

Other
Atlanta and West Point Rail Road
Auf Wiedersehen, Pet, a British sitcom
Average Wholesale Price, the average price at which wholesalers sell prescription drugs
Awaiting parts, a term used in military logistics to indicate lack of part supply
AWP, a weapon in the Counter-Strike series based on the Accuracy International Arctic Warfare sniper rifle